The 2008 Open Sabadell Atlántico Barcelona (also known traditionally as the Torneo Godó) was a tennis tournament played on outdoor clay courts. It was the 56th edition of the Torneo Godó, and was part of the International Series Gold of the 2008 ATP Tour. It took place at the Real Club de Tenis Barcelona in Barcelona, Catalonia, Spain, from April 28 through May 4, 2008.

The singles draw featured ATP No. 2, Monte-Carlo Masters singles and doubles titlist, three-time Barcelona defending champion Rafael Nadal, Australian Open quarterfinalist and Valencia winner David Ferrer, and Acapulco finalist and Buenos Aires champion David Nalbandian. Among other players were Delray Beach and Houston runner-up James Blake, Costa do Sauípe finalist Carlos Moyá, Tommy Robredo, Andy Murray and Ivo Karlović.

The event also featured a seniors' tournament that was part of the ATP Champions Tour, which was held from April 24 to 28. Marcelo Ríos won the title.

Champions

Singles

 Rafael Nadal defeated  David Ferrer 6–1, 4–6, 6–1
 It was Rafael Nadal's 2nd title of the year, and his 25th overall. It was his 4th consecutive win at the event.

Doubles

 Bob Bryan /  Mike Bryan defeated  Mariusz Fyrstenberg /  Marcin Matkowski 6–3, 6–2

Seniors

 Marcelo Ríos defeated  Michael Stich 6–3, 6–3

External links
Official website
ITF – Tournament details
Singles draw
Doubles draw
Qualifying Singles draw

Torneo Godo
 
2008
2008 in Catalan sport
Barcelona
April 2008 sports events in Europe
May 2008 sports events in Europe